Animasola Island is at San Pascual, Masbate, Philippines.

References

Islands of Masbate